Bancroft Bay is a bay lying between Charlotte Bay and Wilhelmina Bay, along the west coast of Graham Land. The bay was first roughly indicated by the Belgian Antarctic Expedition under Gerlache, 1897–99. It was remapped by the Falkland Islands Dependencies Survey from air photos taken by the Falkland Islands and Dependencies Aerial Survey Expedition, 1955–57, and named by the UK Antarctic Place-Names Committee in 1960 for Anthony D. Bancroft, senior surveyor of the latter expedition.

References
 

Bays of Graham Land
Danco Coast